Christa Staak is a German rower, who competed for the SC Dynamo Berlin / Sportvereinigung (SV) Dynamo. She won the medals at the international rowing competitions.

References

German female rowers
Possibly living people
Year of birth missing (living people)
European Rowing Championships medalists
20th-century German women